"You Wear It Well" is a song written by Rod Stewart and Martin Quittenton, performed by Stewart. It uses an arrangement markedly similar to that of "Maggie May", one of Stewart's hits from the previous year.

Stewart recorded "You Wear It Well" for the 1972 album Never a Dull Moment, and released it as a single on 12 August. The song became an international hit, reaching number one on the UK Singles Chart. In the US, "You Wear It Well" peaked at number 13 on the Billboard Hot 100 chart.

Stewart performed the song live on BBC's Top of the Pops with the full lineup of Faces, along with Quittenton on classical guitar and Dick "Tricky Dicky" Powell on fiddle joining them. A live version of the song from his 2013 performance at the Troubadour, West Hollywood was included on the deluxe edition of the album Time.

Chart performance

Weekly charts

Year-end charts

Cover versions

 The 1999 compilation album I Have Been To Heaven And Back: Hen's Teeth and Other Lost Fragments of Unpopular Culture Vol. 1 by the Mekons includes a cover of the song.
 Ali Campbell covered the song on his 2010 album Great British Songs.
 In 2016 Dexys featuring Kevin Rowland covered the song on their album Let The Record Show: Dexys Do Irish And Country Soul
 A cover by Hurricane No. 1 is included in their compilation Step into My World.
 In 2022 The Black Crowes covered the song on their "1972 EP".

References

Rod Stewart songs
1972 singles
UK Singles Chart number-one singles
Songs written by Rod Stewart
Songs written by Martin Quittenton
1972 songs
Mercury Records singles